Fincastle (from the Celtic Fonachajsical, "the Land of Castles") is a glen in Perthshire, Scotland. It may also refer to:

Places
Fincastle, Alberta, a locality in Canada
Fincastle, Indiana, an unincorporated community
Fincastle, Kentucky, United States
Fincastle, Lee County, Kentucky, an unincorporated community
Fincastle, Ohio, an unincorporated community
Fincastle, Tennessee, an unincorporated community
Fincastle, Texas, an unincorporated community
Fincastle, Virginia, United States
Fincastle Historic District, Fincastle, VA
Fincastle County, Virginia, a former county

Other
Viscount of Fincastle, a title related to the Earl of Dunmore; also refers to the person holding the title, i.e. "Lord Fincastle"
Fincastle Turnpike, a toll road in Virginia
The Fincastle competition, a yearly competition among the Commonwealth Air Forces
Fincastle Resolutions, declarations of Fincastle Cty, VA just prior to the revolution

See also
Fort Fincastle (disambiguation)
Fin Castle, a castle in Hormozgan Province, Iran
Fan Castle or Fan City, an ancient fortified city now the Fancheng District of Xiangyang, China